Anselmo Arruda da Silva (born 2 July 1990), commonly known as Casagrande, is a Brazilian professional footballer who plays as a striker for Malaysia Super League club Negeri Sembilan.

Career statistics

Club
 

Notes

Honours

Club
Penang
 Malaysia Premier League: 2020

Individual
Malaysia Premier League top goalscorer: 2020

References

1986 births
Living people
Brazilian footballers
Brazilian expatriate footballers
Association football forwards
Botafogo Futebol Clube (PB) players
Maranhão Atlético Clube players
Sampaio Corrêa Futebol Clube players
Esporte Clube Jacuipense players
Associação Atlética Coruripe players
Salgueiro Atlético Clube players
Kuala Lumpur City F.C. players
Campinense Clube players
Boa Esporte Clube players
Felcra FC players
Melaka United F.C. players
Negeri Sembilan FC players
Penang F.C. players
Malaysia Premier League players
Campeonato Brasileiro Série B players
Malaysia Super League players
Brazilian expatriate sportspeople in Malaysia
Expatriate footballers in Malaysia